Rizwan Ahmad Khan (born 13 August 1940) is an Indian politician and member of the Peace Party of India and the Bahujan Samaj Party. He represented Kanth (Assembly constituency), Uttar Pradesh in the 14th and 15th Legislative Assembly of Uttar Pradesh. He held office from February 2002 to March 2012.

References 

1940 births
Living people
Peace Party of India politicians
Bahujan Samaj Party politicians from Uttar Pradesh
Uttar Pradesh MLAs 2002–2007
Uttar Pradesh MLAs 2007–2012